The Thurman Station Bridge is a two–lane bridge that carries NY 418 across the Hudson River connecting Thurman, New York with Warrensburg, New York. It was built in 1941.

See also
List of fixed crossings of the Hudson River

References

Bridges over the Hudson River
Bridges completed in 1941
Road bridges in New York (state)
Steel bridges in the United States
Transportation buildings and structures in Warren County, New York